Obituary is an American death metal band formed in Tampa, Florida, in 1984. They were one of the fundamental acts in the development of death metal music, and are one of the most successful death metal bands of all time. To date, Obituary has released eleven studio albums, and with the exception of their 1997–2003 split, they continue to perform live.

Initially called Executioner, the band changed its name to Xecutioner in 1986 to avoid confusion with the thrash metal band Executioner from Boston, and then changed its name once again to Obituary in 1988. Obituary's current lineup consists of vocalist John Tardy, drummer Donald Tardy, rhythm guitarist Trevor Peres, bassist Terry Butler, and lead guitarist Ken Andrews. The band has gone through several lineup changes, with the Tardy brothers and Peres being the only constant members. Their music is based around heavily groove-based riffs and drumming along with John Tardy's growling vocals, which create their own signature sound of death metal.

History

Early career (1984–1990)
Founded as Executioner in Seffner, Florida in 1984, they soon dropped the "E" from their name after discovering another band of the same name, becoming Xecutioner. The band's first lineup was composed of John Tardy (lead vocals), Donald Tardy (drums), Trevor Peres (rhythm guitar), Jerome Grable (bass) and Jerry Tidwell (lead guitar). The band was inspired by Savatage and bands in the burgeoning Florida death metal scene: Nasty Savage, Death, and Morbid Angel. The band released demos in 1985, 1986, and 1987, (the 1985 demo as Executioner and the 1986 and 1987 demos as Xecutioner). They made their vinyl debut in 1987 with two tracks ("Find the Arise" and "Like the Dead") on the Raging Death compilation.

Not long after the release of the compilation, bassist Grable was replaced by Daniel Tucker and guitarist Tidwell was replaced by Allen West. The following year, shortly before the release of the band's first album Slowly We Rot, they changed their name to Obituary. Right after the release of Slowly We Rot, however, Tucker and West quit the band and were respectively replaced by Frank Watkins and then-Death guitarist James Murphy. This new lineup recorded the band's second album Cause of Death, which was released in September 1990, and is often considered to be one of the most important death metal albums of all time. Obituary supported Cause of Death with its first world tour, first the US with Sacred Reich and Forced Entry, Europe with Demolition Hammer and Morgoth and then back to the US with Sepultura and Sadus.

Rise to success (1991–1996)
In 1991, just prior to the writing and recording sessions of their third album, Murphy left Obituary to join Cancer and was replaced by a returning Allen West. The lineup of Peres, Watkins, West and the Tardy brothers recorded the band's next three albums, starting with The End Complete (1992). The End Complete was a moderate success for Obituary, having sold more than a hundred thousand copies, and it was the band's first album to chart in the US and Europe. This success also resulted in the release of Obituary's first-ever music video "The End Complete", which received significant airplay on MTV's Headbangers Ball, and the band toured behind the album in over year, going from playing clubs to theaters and arenas.

Obituary's fourth studio album, World Demise, was released in September 1994. Although the album did not sell as well as The End Complete, it still managed to reach the top 100 in several territories, including the United States, United Kingdom, Germany, Switzerland and the Netherlands, and a video for "Don't Care" was shot. In support of World Demise, the band toured the US with Napalm Death and a then-unknown Machine Head, and Europe with Pitchshifter and Eyehategod.

Breakup and comeback (1997–2014)

After the release of their fifth album Back from the Dead (1997), the band had grown tired of touring, which led to the group disbanding. During this time period, Donald Tardy played in Andrew W.K.'s touring band (during W.K.'s appearance on Saturday Night Live Tardy wore an Obituary shirt). Allen West focused on his two projects, Lowbrow and Six Feet Under. Trevor Peres formed Catastrophic in 2001, which released one album, The Cleansing, in that same year. Obituary reformed in 2003 and Catastrophic continued to exist alongside the reformed Obituary. A reunion album, Frozen in Time, was released in 2005. The band's first live DVD, Frozen Alive, was released in January 2007.

Obituary was signed with Candlelight Records for its next three releases, Xecutioner's Return (2007), Darkest Day (2009), and the EP Left to Die (2008). A concert DVD release was also announced for January 2010. Since 2012, the band have been highly involved with the promotion of a new social networking site called Unation, as well as Donald Tardy beginning a Cat Sanctuary organization called Metal Meowlisha, an organization practicing "trap-neuter-vaccinate-return", and caring for 25 cat colonies (200 cats).

In April 2010, Obituary began work on new material for their ninth studio album Inked in Blood, which was not released until 2014. It was the first Obituary album not to be recorded with longtime bassist Frank Watkins since their 1989 debut album Slowly We Rot. In 2013, the band rebuilt their studio, and continued work on the new album. On August 2, 2013, the band launched a Kickstarter campaign with a goal of raising $10,000.00; the money raised was promised to allow Obituary to record and release their ninth album independently. The goal was met on August 3. When interviewed by metal webzine All About the Rock, John Tardy said of the Kickstarter campaign, "This campaign has been awesome and just confirms again what we already know and that is that we have the greatest fans in the world. We are using Kickstarter to raise enough money to release an album on our own. This is not a bash against record companies, it is just what we want to do. Years ago this would not even be a thought, but today we feel everything is in place for us, for better or worse, give it a shot.". Though the band raised enough money to self-released, they were still signed to Relapse Records and partnered with the label for distribution of Inked In Blood, their first Relapse release.

Recent events (2015–present)
On October 18, 2015, former and longtime Obituary bassist Frank Watkins died from cancer.

On August 24, 2016, Obituary streamed a new song called "Loathe", a B-side to their then-upcoming single "Ten Thousand Ways to Die", which was released on October 21. The band released their self-titled tenth studio album on March 17, 2017. A month prior to its release, the band released a song called "No", which appeared on Decibel magazine's flexi disc series.

In November and December 2018, Obituary embarked on a European tour as part of Slayer's farewell tour, also featuring Lamb of God and Anthrax. When asked in a June 2018 interview about the next Obituary album, drummer Donald Tardy said, "We're always thinking about new songs and writing riffs and this and that. But at this time of our lives and this time of the music industry… This new album has only been out for just over a year now, so we're in no hurry to try and push another album out of us as quick as we can; there's no sense." In an August 2020 interview with Australia's Riff Crew, Donald Tardy revealed that, during the quarantine, Obituary had been working on a "monster" of a new album planned for release in 2021. The band had planned to tour in 2021, specifically Europe, in support of the record. In a March 2021 interview with France's United Rock Nations, vocalist John Tardy reiterated his brother's comments, saying that Obituary had been working on new material during the COVID-19 pandemic, and added that their new album would be released in 2022, with a tour to follow. On November 10, 2022, Obituary released "The Wrong Time" as the lead single from their then-upcoming eleventh studio album Dying of Everything, released on January 13, 2023.

Band members

Current members
 John Tardy – vocals (1988–1997, 2003–present)
 Donald Tardy – drums (1988–1997, 2003–present)
 Trevor Peres – rhythm guitar (1988–1997, 2003–present)
 Terry Butler – bass (2010–present)
 Ken Andrews – lead guitar (2012–present)

Former members
 Allen West – lead guitar (1988–1989, 1991–1997, 2003–2006)
 Daniel Tucker – bass (1988–1989)
 James Murphy – lead guitar (1989–1991)
 Frank Watkins – bass (1989–1997, 2003–2010; died 2015)
 Ralph Santolla – lead guitar (2007–2011; died 2018)

Touring musicians
 Peter Klavinger – lead guitar  (1999)
 Steve Di Giorgio – bass (2010)
 Lee Harrison – lead guitar (2012), drums (2018)

Timeline

Discography

 Slowly We Rot (1989)
 Cause of Death (1990)
 The End Complete (1992)
 World Demise (1994)
 Back from the Dead (1997)
 Frozen in Time (2005)
 Xecutioner's Return (2007)
 Darkest Day (2009)
 Inked in Blood (2014)
 Obituary (2017)
 Dying of Everything (2023)

References

Further reading
 [ Obituary at Allmusic]
 [ Slowly We Rot at Allmusic]

External links

 Obituary.cc

1984 establishments in Florida
Articles which contain graphical timelines
Death metal musical groups from Florida
Musical groups from Tampa, Florida
Musical groups established in 1984
Musical groups disestablished in 1997
Musical groups reestablished in 2003
Musical quintets
Roadrunner Records artists
Candlelight Records artists